The 2014 Red Bull Air Race of Abu Dhabi was the 1st round of the 2014 Red Bull Air Race World Championship, the ninth season of the Red Bull Air Race World Championship. The event was held in Abu Dhabi, the capital city of the United Arab Emirates.

Master Class

Qualification

Round of 12

 Pilot received 2 seconds in penalties.

Super 8

Final 4

Challenger Class

Results

Standings after the event

Master Class standings

Challenger Class standings

 Note: Only the top five positions are included for both sets of standings.

References

External links

|- style="text-align:center"
|width="35%"|Previous race:2010 Red Bull Air Race of Lisbon
|width="30%"|Red Bull Air Race2014 season
|width="35%"|Next race:2014 Red Bull Air Race of Rovinj
|- style="text-align:center"
|width="35%"|Previous race:2010 Red Bull Air Race of Abu Dhabi
|width="30%"|Red Bull Air Race of Abu Dhabi
|width="35%"|Next race:2015 Red Bull Air Race of Abu Dhabi
|- style="text-align:center"

Red Bull Air Race
Abu Dhabi
Red Bull Air Race of Abu Dhabi
Red Bull Air Race of Abu Dhabi